Demirköprü Dam is an embankment dam on the Gediz River in Manisa Province, Turkey. Constructed between 1954 and 1960, the development was backed by the Turkish State Hydraulic Works.

See also

List of dams and reservoirs in Turkey

External links
DSI, State Hydraulic Works (Turkey), Retrieved December 16, 2009

Dams in Manisa Province
Hydroelectric power stations in Turkey
Dams completed in 1960